Jordan Maron (born February 10, 1992), also known by his online alias CaptainSparklez, is an American YouTuber, Twitch streamer, gamer, and musician. Maron is primarily known for playing the video game Minecraft, which is featured on his main channel, CaptainSparklez.  his 11 YouTube channels have collectively earned over  million subscribers and  billion video views, and his main channel is the 281st most-subscribed channel on YouTube with over 11.3 million subscribers. Maron has produced several Minecraft-themed songs and music videos.

Early life 
Maron was born in Los Angeles, California. At four years old, he and his mother moved to Santa Barbara. He attended Santa Barbara High School, beginning in ninth grade. Maron then went to the University of California, Santa Barbara as a chemical engineering major. He then decided to switch his major to computer science midway through his freshman year, based on his interest in video games. After the first quarter of his sophomore year, he dropped out. In December 2011, he made YouTube his full-time job.

Internet career

Content 
Maron operates eleven YouTube channels, four of which are currently active. Maron is best known for his internet content in the video game Minecraft. Maron releases daily videos, which aided in the creation of his fanbase.

History 
On February 9, 2010, he created his first channel titled ProsDONTtalkSHIT (PDTS) where he primarily uploaded gameplay videos of Call of Duty: Modern Warfare 2. When the channel became more popular, Maron wanted a less vulgar name. He created a new channel named CaptainSparklez on July 20, 2010, and left PDTS inactive. Maron began creating Minecraft content in 2010. Maron began livestreaming since 2011 on justin.tv, which was later migrated to Twitch. In April 2012, the CaptainSparklez channel reached 1 million subscribers on YouTube. In September 2013, CaptainSparklez reached 1 billion video views, becoming the fifth solo YouTube gaming channel to reach the milestone behind PewDiePie, SkyDoesMinecraft, UberHaxorNova and TobyGames.

Maron started a mobile gaming company called XREAL with Howard Marks, co-founder and former CEO of Activision and co-founder of Acclaim Games and StartEngine. XREAL released their game Fortress Fury in May 2015, which received over 1.5 million downloads within its first month of launch. Fortress Fury was originally titled Fortress Fallout; however, ZeniMax Media, parent company of Bethesda Softworks, known for the Fallout series, sent a cease and desist letter which requested that XREAL "immediately expressly abandon the application for Fortress Fallout and cease any and all current or proposed use of any mark incorporating the term Fallout." The letter was sent to prevent competition in the mobile game market for their game Fallout Shelter. Maron and the XREAL's legal team were not informed of this, because Bethesda kept Shelter a secret at the time and did not reveal its existence until its release on June 14, 2015.

Maron was featured in the 2016 Forbes 30 Under 30 list. In June 2016, he made an appearance in the sixth episode of Minecraft: Story Mode. On May 28, 2022, Maron was on a winning MC Championship team for the first time.

Musical career 
On February 26, 2011, he released his first Minecraft music video, "TNT", a parody of Taio Cruz's "Dynamite", with vocals from singer TryHardNinja. The video is currently the fourth-most-viewed video on Maron's channel with over 116 million views, surpassing the number of views of the original song.

On August 19, 2011, he released his second Minecraft music video titled "Revenge", which is a parody of Usher's "DJ Got Us Fallin' in Love". The video has over 280 million views, making it the most viewed video on Maron's channel. In July 2019, following the 10th anniversary of Minecraft, the song received renewed attention as an internet meme. This has led to "Revenge" reaching the number one spot on Genius' Top Songs chart.

Released April 1, 2012, "Fallen Kingdom" is a parody of Coldplay's "Viva la Vida".

Maron created a parody video called "Minecraft Style", based on "Gangnam Style" by PSY, that used animated Minecraft models. According to MSN, within a few days, it had more than a million views. The video was referenced in technology and gaming articles published by NBC, The Daily Telegraph, Mashable and the Huffington Post. The original video was removed from YouTube due to copyright issues. Since its reupload, the video has gained over 46 million views.

Discography

Music released as Jordan Maron

Singles

Remixes

As featured artist

Awards 
Nominated in 2016 Shorty Awards

Notes 

A .
B

References

External links 
CaptainSparklez, his main channel

1992 births
American YouTubers
Gaming YouTubers
Living people
Maker Studios people
Minecraft YouTubers
Music YouTubers
People from Santa Barbara, California
Twitch (service) streamers
Video game commentators
YouTube channels launched in 2010